This is a list of members of the Council of the German Cultural Community between 1999 and 2004, following the direct elections of 1999.

Composition

Sources
 

List
1999 in Belgium
2000s in Belgium